"White Walls" is a hip hop song by an American hip hop duo Macklemore & Ryan Lewis, taken from their collaborative debut studio album The Heist (2012). The song's hook is performed by singer Hollis, while American rapper Schoolboy Q, performs a guest verse. "White Walls" was released to American contemporary hit radio on October 8, 2013 as the fifth and final single from The Heist. The song debuted at number 100 and has since peaked at number 15 on the US Billboard Hot 100 and has sold 1,000,000 copies as of January 2014.

Release and promotion
The song charted at number one on the US Bubbling Under R&B/Hip-Hop Singles prior to its release as a single, due to high digital downloads subsequently after the album's release. Macklemore, Ryan Lewis, Schoolboy Q and Hollis performed "White Walls" on The Tonight Show with Jay Leno on August 27, 2013. The song impacted American contemporary hit radio on October 8, 2013.

In November 2020, “White Walls” went viral on TikTok, being used in many videos.

Music video 
The music video, directed by Macklemore, Ryan Lewis and Jason Koenig, was released September 9, 2013. The video features cameo appearances from several rappers including A$AP Rocky, Trinidad Jame$, Wiz Khalifa, Big Boi and Sir Mix-a-Lot, as well as DJ Drama. Parts of the music video are shot inside a Vogue Tyre warehouse, and the eponymous whitewall tires are explicitly mentioned by Macklemore to be Vogues. The video also features several Cadillac models, including an SRX, Escalade, two XLRs, several Eldorados and a Coupe de Ville.

Charts

Weekly charts

Year-end charts

Certifications

References

2012 songs
2013 singles
Macklemore songs
Ryan Lewis songs
Schoolboy Q songs
Warner Records singles
Songs written by Schoolboy Q
Songs written by Macklemore
Songs written by Ryan Lewis